was a samurai from Joseon who served the Maeda clan in the early Edo period. He was one of the most successful samurai from Korea and was promoted to Commissioner of Kanazawa city.

He was born in Hanseong, and his original name was Kim Yeo-cheol. He was the son of Kim Si-seong, an official of Joseon government. In 1592, his father was killed during the Japanese invasions of Korea (1592–98). After Hanseong had been captured by Japanese army, Yeocheol was taken prisoner by the troop of Ukita Hideie. He was brought to Nagoya castle, then Okayama. He was raised by Hideie's wife Gō in Okayama. Next year, Gō went to Kanazawa and met her brother Maeda Toshinaga. Toshinaga's wife Eihime was so pleased with her attendant Yeolcheol that decided to raise him in Kanazawa.

He was named Kyūbei and served Toshinaga as page who was given 230 koku. In 1605, he was adopted by the Wakita family (retainer of the Maeda clan) through the good offices of Eihime. He changed his name to Wakita Naokata. He performed distinguished services in the siege of Osaka and was given 1000 koku as reward. He was promoted smoothly in the Kaga domain. Finally, he became Kanazawa machi bugyo (金沢町奉行): the commissioner of Kanazawa city.

His father was Yangban, a Scholar-official of the Joseon dynasty. Naokata also displayed his literary talent. He was one of the most prominent masters of Renga in Kaga and had thorough knowledge of The Tale of Genji and Kokin Wakashū.

Gyokusen-en, the Japanese garden in Kanazawa, was built by successive heads of the Wakita family from Naokata to the fourth head, Kyubei. The name of the garden was taken from the benefactor of Naokata: Eihime. She became a Buddhist nun and took the name Gyokusen-in in 1614. It is said that Naokata was a kakure kirishitan. He erected a stone lantern with the Virgin Mary engraved on it in Gyokusen-en. In his later years, he became a Buddhist priest and changed his name to Jotetsu (如鉄), using the same Chinese characters of his original name.

See also 
 List of foreign-born samurai in Japan

References

Further reading
家伝: 金(脇田) 如鉄自伝 翻刻解説（笠井順一著、金沢大学教養部論集. 人文科学篇所収、1990年。リンク先は金沢大学学術情報リポジトリによる公開）

People of Azuchi–Momoyama-period Japan
Foreign samurai in Japan
Kaga-Maeda retainers
Japanese people of Korean descent
17th-century Korean people
People from Seoul
1585 births
1660 deaths
People of Edo-period Japan
Edo period Buddhists
Zainichi Korean people